World Wide Open is the debut studio album by American country music band Love and Theft. It was released on August 25, 2009 (see 2009 in country music) via Carolwood Records, a sister label of Lyric Street Records. The album includes the single "Runaway", which is a Top 10 hit on the Billboard Hot Country Songs charts.

Content
At least one member of the band had a hand in co-writing every track on the album. Co-writers include former RCA Records artist Robert Ellis Orrall, as well as Roger Springer and The Warren Brothers. Lead-off single "Runaway", which Stephen Barker Liles co-wrote, has reached Top 10 on the U.S. Billboard Hot Country Songs charts. Shortly after "Runaway" peaked, Carolwood was consolidated with Lyric Street Records. The second single is "Dancing in Circles."

Critical reception
Todd Sterling gave four stars out of five in his Allmusic review, where he referred to the album as "teeming with tasty pop melodies and delicious hooks" and said that it should allow the band to compete with labelmates Rascal Flatts. Chris Neal of Country Weekly magazine gave the album three-and-a-half stars out of five. His review calls the album "surprisingly subdued" outside the lead-off single and makes note of the shared lead vocals among all three members, but also criticizes the vocals for not showing the members' personalities clearly. The New York Times reviewer Jon Caramanica gave a mixed review, calling it "charmingly uncomplicated, a promising album from a band making the most of limited resources."

Track listing

Personnel
Love and Theft
Brian Bandas – lead vocals, background vocals, piano, acoustic guitar, electric guitar
Eric Gunderson – lead vocals, background vocals, acoustic guitar, bass guitar
Stephen Barker Liles – lead vocals, background vocals
Additional musicians
Mike Brignardello – bass guitar
Tom Bukovac – electric guitar
Joe Caverlee – fiddle, mandolin
Jeff Coplan – acoustic guitar, electric guitar, bass guitar, mandolin, Dobro, percussion, Hammond B-3 organ
Eric Darken – percussion
Dan Dugmore – steel guitar
Connie Ellisor – violin
Shannon Forrest – drums
Kevin Haynie – banjo
Chris McHugh – drums
Greg Morrow – drums
Robert Ellis Orrall – percussion, Hammond B-3 organ, keyboards
Carole Rabinowitz-Neuen – cello
Darren Theriault – bass guitar

Strings arrangements by David Hoffner.

Chart performance

Album

Singles

References

2009 debut albums
Love and Theft (duo) albums
Lyric Street Records albums